Le Frêche is a commune in the Landes department in Nouvelle-Aquitaine in southwestern France.

Le Frêche is situated in the heart of the region of Armagnac and produces the best Armagnac (brandy) in southwestern France.

Population

Sights
 Saint-Vidou Church
 Lafitte-Boingnères Castle

See also
Communes of the Landes department

References

External links
 Le Frêche on the site of the national geographical Institute
 Le Frêche tourism and Armagnac(brandy)

Communes of Landes (department)